Charles J. Cavanaugh (23 January 1911 - 18 February 2004) was a biologist and professor of biology at the Louisiana College from 1945 to 1977. He was born in Leesville, Louisiana and died in Pineville, Louisiana. The C. J. Cavanaugh endowed chair in biology was created in his honor.

References

1911 births
2004 deaths
University of Tennessee alumni
20th-century American educators
20th-century American biologists
Scientists from Louisiana
Louisiana Christian University
People from Leesville, Louisiana